KLM Royal Dutch Airlines, legally Koninklijke Luchtvaart Maatschappij N.V., is the flag carrier airline of the Netherlands. KLM is headquartered in Amstelveen, with its hub at nearby Amsterdam Airport Schiphol. It is part of the Air France–KLM group and a member of the SkyTeam airline alliance. Founded in 1919, KLM is the oldest operating airline in the world, and has 35,488 employees with a fleet of 110 (excluding subsidiaries) . KLM operates scheduled passenger and cargo services to 145 destinations.

History

Early years

In 1919, a young aviator lieutenant named Albert Plesman sponsored the ELTA aviation exhibition in Amsterdam. Attendance at the exhibition was over half a million, and after it closed, several Dutch commercial interests intended to establish a Dutch airline, which Plesman was nominated to head. In September 1919, Queen Wilhelmina awarded the yet-to-be-founded KLM its "Royal" ("Koninklijke") predicate. On 7 October 1919, eight Dutch businessmen, including Frits Fentener van Vlissingen, founded KLM as one of the first commercial airline companies. Plesman became its first administrator and director.

The first KLM flight took place on 17 May 1920. KLM's first pilot, Jerry Shaw, flew from Croydon Airport, London, to Amsterdam. The flight was flown using a leased Aircraft Transport and Travel de Havilland DH-16, registration G-EALU, which was carrying two British journalists and some newspapers. In 1920, KLM carried 440 passengers and 22 tons of freight. In April 1921, after a winter hiatus, KLM resumed its services using its pilots, and Fokker F.II and Fokker F.III aircraft. In 1921, KLM started scheduled services.

KLM's first intercontinental experimental flight took off on 1 October 1924. The final destination was Jakarta (then called 'Batavia'), Java, in the Dutch East Indies; the flight used a Fokker F.VII with registration H-NACC and was piloted by Van der Hoop. In 1927, Baltimore millionaire Van Lear Black, who had heard about the 1924 flight, chartered H-NADP to do the same flight, which departed June 15 and went successfully (16 days), and flew back to much rejoicing. This inspired KLM to make a second test flight, which left on October 1, returning successfully with much experience gained. In September 1929, regular scheduled services between Amsterdam and Batavia commenced. Until the outbreak of the Second World War in 1939, this was the world's longest-distance scheduled service by airplane. By 1926, it was offering flights to Amsterdam, Rotterdam, Brussels, Paris, London, Bremen, Copenhagen, and Malmö, using primarily Fokker F.II and Fokker F.III aircraft.

In 1930, KLM carried 15,143 passengers. The Douglas DC-2 was introduced on the Batavia service in 1934. The first experimental transatlantic KLM flight was between Amsterdam and Curaçao in December 1934 using the Fokker F.XVIII "Snip". The first of the airline's Douglas DC-3 aircraft were delivered in 1936; these replaced the DC-2s on the service via Batavia to Sydney. KLM was the first airline to serve Manchester's new Ringway airport, starting June 1938. KLM was the only civilian airline to receive the Douglas DC-5; the airline used two of them in the West Indies and sold two to the East Indies government, and is thus the only airline to have operated all Douglas 'DC' models other than the DC-1.

Second World War

The outbreak of the Second World War in September 1939 restricted KLM's operations, with flights over France and Germany prohibited, and many of its aircraft painted in over-all orange to limit the potential for confusion with military aircraft. European routes were limited to services to Scandinavia, Belgium and the UK, with flights to Lisbon (bypassing both British and French airspace) starting in April 1940.

When Germany invaded the Netherlands on 10 May 1940, several KLM aircraft—mostly DC-3s and a few DC-2s—were en route to or from the Far East, or were operating services in Europe. Five DC-3s and one DC-2 were taken to Britain. During the war, these aircraft and crew members flew scheduled passenger flights between Bristol and Lisbon under BOAC flight numbers and registration.

On 3 March 1942, Douglas DC-3 PH-ALP "Pelikaan", then registered as PK-AFV, was shot down over Western Australia by Imperial Japanese Navy Air Service Mitsubishi A6M Zeros during the Attack on Broome while carrying a package of diamonds. The DC-3 crash landed at Carnot Bay, 80 kilometers from Broome. Pelikaan was subsequently strafed by the Zeros that had shot it down, killing three passengers and the flight engineer. Diamonds worth an estimated Australian pound 150,000–300,000 were stolen from the wreckage of the aircraft, and nobody has been convicted of the crime.

Douglas DC-3 PH-ALI "Ibis", then registered as G-AGBB, was attacked by the Luftwaffe on 15 November 1942, 19 April 1943, and finally shot down on 1 June 1943 as BOAC Flight 777, killing all passengers and crew.

Some KLM aircraft and their crews ended up in the Australia-Dutch East Indies region, where they helped transport refugees from Japanese aggression in that area.

Although operations paused in Europe, KLM continued to fly and expand in the Caribbean.

Post-World War II 

After the end of the Second World War in August 1945, KLM immediately started to rebuild its network. Since the Dutch East Indies were in a state of revolt, Plesman's priority was to re-establish KLM's route to Batavia. This service was reinstated by the end of 1945. Domestic and European flights resumed in September 1945, initially with a fleet of Douglas DC-3s and Douglas DC-4s. On 21 May 1946, KLM was the first continental European airline to start scheduled transatlantic flights between Amsterdam and New York City using Douglas DC-4 aircraft. By 1948, KLM had reconstructed its network and services to Africa, North and South America, and the Caribbean resumed.

Long-range, pressurized Lockheed Constellations and Douglas DC-6s joined KLM's fleet in the late 1940s; the Convair 240 short-range pressurized twin-engine airliner began European flights for the company in late 1948.

During the immediate post-war period, the Dutch government expressed interest in gaining a majority stake in KLM, thus partially nationalizing it. Plesman wanted KLM to remain a private company under private control; he allowed the Dutch government to acquire a minority stake in the airline. In 1950, KLM carried 356,069 passengers. The expansion of the network continued in the 1950s with the addition of several destinations in western North America. KLM's fleet expanded with the addition of new versions of the Lockheed Constellation and Lockheed Electra, of which KLM was the first European airline to fly.

On 31 December 1953, the founder and president of KLM, Albert Plesman, died at the age of 64. He was succeeded as president by Fons Aler. After Plesman's death, the company and other airlines entered a difficult economic period. The conversion to jet aircraft placed a further financial burden on KLM. The Netherlands government increased its ownership of the company to two-thirds, thus partly nationalizing it. The board of directors remained under the control of private shareholders.

On 25 July 1957, the airline introduced its flight simulator for the Douglas DC-7C – the last KLM aircraft with piston engines – which opened the transpolar route from Amsterdam via Anchorage to Tokyo on 1 November 1958. Each crew flying the transpolar route over the Arctic was equipped with a winter survival kit, including a 7.62 mm selective-fire AR-10 carbine for use against polar bears, in the event the plane was forced down onto the polar ice.

Jet age
The four-engine turboprop Vickers Viscount 800 was introduced on European routes in 1957. Beginning in September 1959, KLM introduced the four-engine turboprop Lockheed L-188 Electra onto some of its European and Middle Eastern routes. In March 1960, the airline introduced the first Douglas DC-8 jet into its fleet. In 1961, KLM reported its first year of losses. In 1961, the airline's president Fons Aler was succeeded by Ernst van der Beugel. This change of leadership, however, did not lead to a reversal of KLM's financial difficulties. Van der Beugel resigned as president in 1963 due to health reasons. Horatius Albarda was appointed to succeed Ernst van der Beugel as president of KLM in 1963. Alberda initiated a reorganization of the company, which led to the reduction of staff and air services. In 1965, Alberda died in an air crash and was succeeded as president by Dr. Gerrit van der Wal. Van der Wal forged an agreement with the Dutch government that KLM would be once again run as a private company. By 1966, the stake of the Dutch government in KLM was reduced to a minority stake of 49.5%. In 1966, KLM introduced the Douglas DC-9 on European and Middle East routes.

The new terminal buildings at Amsterdam Airport Schiphol opened in April 1967, and in 1968 the stretched Douglas DC-8-63 ("Super DC-8") entered service. With 244 seats, the Super DC-8 was the largest airliner in scheduled passenger service at the time. KLM was the first airline to put the higher-gross-weight Boeing 747-200B, powered by Pratt & Whitney JT9D engines, into service in February 1971; this began the airline's use of widebody jets. In March 1971, KLM opened its current headquarters in Amstelveen. In 1972, it purchased the first of several McDonnell Douglas DC-10 aircraft—McDonnell Douglas's response to Boeing's 747.

In 1973, Sergio Orlandini was appointed to succeed Gerrit van der Wal as president of KLM. At the time, KLM, as well as other airlines, had to deal with overcapacity. Orlandini proposed to convert KLM 747s to "combis" that could carry a combination of passengers and freight in a mixed configuration on the main deck of the aircraft. In November 1975, the first of these seven Boeing 747-200B Combi aircraft were added to the KLM fleet. The airline previously operated DC-8 passenger and freight combi aircraft as well and currently operates Boeing 747-400 combi aircraft.

The 1973 oil crisis, which caused difficult economic conditions, led KLM to seek government assistance in arranging debt refinancing. The airline issued additional shares of stock to the government in return for its money. In the late 1970s, the government's stake had again increased to a majority of 78%, effectively re-nationalizing it. The company management remained under the control of private stakeholders.

1980s and 1990s

In 1980, KLM carried 9,715,069 passengers. In 1983, it reached an agreement with Boeing to upgrade ten of its Boeing 747-200 aircraft (Three 747-200Bs and seven 747-200Ms) with the stretched-upper-deck modification. The work started in 1984 at the Boeing factory in Everett, Washington, and finished in 1986. The converted aircraft were called Boeing 747-200SUD or 747-300, which the airline operated in addition to three newly built Boeing 747-300s manufactured from the ground up. In 1983, KLM took delivery of the first of ten Airbus A310 passenger jets. Sergio Orlandini retired in 1987 and was succeeded as president of KLM by Jan de Soet. In 1986, the Dutch government's shareholding in KLM was reduced to 54.8 percent. It was expected that this share would be further reduced during the decade. The Boeing 747-400 was introduced into KLM's fleet in June 1989.

With the liberalization of the European market, KLM started developing its hub at Amsterdam Airport Schiphol by feeding its network with traffic from affiliated airlines. As part of its development of a worldwide network, KLM acquired a 20% stake in Northwest Airlines in July 1989. In 1990, KLM carried 16,000,000 passengers. KLM president Jan de Soet retired at the end of 1990 and was succeeded in 1991 by Pieter Bouw. In December 1991, KLM was the first European airline to introduce a frequent flyer loyalty program, which was called Flying Dutchman.

Joint venture
In January 1993, the United States Department of Transportation granted KLM and Northwest Airlines anti-trust immunity, which allowed them to intensify their partnership. As of September 1993, the airlines operated their flights between the United States and Europe as part of a joint venture. In March 1994, KLM and Northwest Airlines introduced World Business Class on intercontinental routes. KLM's stake in Northwest Airlines was increased to 25% in 1994.

KLM introduced the Boeing 767-300ER in July 1995. In January 1996, KLM acquired a 26% share in Kenya Airways, the flag-carrier airline of Kenya. In 1997, Pieter Bouw resigned as president of KLM and was succeeded by Leo van Wijk. In August 1998, KLM repurchased all regular shares from the Dutch government to make KLM a private company. On 1 November 1999, KLM founded AirCares, a communication and fundraising platform supporting worthy causes and focusing on underprivileged children.

KLM renewed its intercontinental fleets by replacing the Boeing 767s, Boeing 747-300s, and eventually, the McDonnell Douglas MD-11s with Boeing 777-200ERs and Airbus A330-200s. Some 747s were withdrawn from service first. The MD-11s remained in service until October 2014. The first Boeing 777 was received on 25 October 2003, while the first Airbus A330-200 was introduced on 25 August 2005.

Air France–KLM merger
On 30 September 2003, Air France and KLM agreed to a merger plan in which Air France and KLM would become subsidiaries of a holding company called Air France–KLM. Both airlines would retain their own brands; both Charles de Gaulle Airport and Amsterdam Airport Schiphol would become key hubs. In February 2004, the European Commission and United States Department of Justice approved the proposed merger of the airlines. In April 2004, an exchange offer in which KLM shareholders exchanged their KLM shares for Air France shares took place. Since 5 May 2004, Air France–KLM has been listed on the Euronext exchanges in Paris, Amsterdam and New York. In September 2004, the merger was completed by creation of the Air France–KLM holding company. The merger resulted in the world's largest airline group and should have led to an estimated annual cost-saving of between €400 million and €500 million.

It did not appear that KLM's longstanding joint venture with Northwest Airlines—which merged with Delta Air Lines in 2008—was affected by the merger with Air France. KLM and Northwest joined the SkyTeam alliance in September 2004. Also in 2004, senior management came under fire for providing itself with controversial bonuses after the merger with Air France, while 4,500 jobs were lost at KLM. After external pressure, management gave up on these bonuses.

In March 2007, KLM started to use the Amadeus reservation system, along with partner Kenya Airways. After 10 years as president of the airline, Leo van Wijk resigned from his position and was succeeded by Peter Hartman.

2010s
Beginning in September 2010, KLM integrated the passenger division of Martinair into KLM, transferring all personnel and routes. By November 2011, Martinair consisted of only the cargo and maintenance division. In March 2011, KLM and InselAir reached an agreement for mutual cooperation on InselAir destinations, thus expanding its passenger services. Beginning 27 March 2011, KLM passengers could fly to all InselAir destinations through InselAir's hubs in Curaçao and Sint Maarten. This cooperation was extended to a code share agreement in 2012. In early 2018, the cooperation with Inselair was terminated, including any interlining agreements, after Inselair found itself in financial difficulties which forced the airline to sell off part of its fleet and cancel some of its routes.

On 20 February 2013, KLM announced that Peter Hartman would resign as president and CEO of KLM on 1 July 2013. He was succeeded by Camiel Eurlings. Hartman remained employed by the company until he retired on 1 January 2014. On 15 October 2014, KLM announced that Eurlings, in joint consultation with the supervisory board, had decided to immediately resign as president and CEO. As of this date, he was succeeded by Pieter Elbers. KLM received the award for "Best Airline Staff Service" in Europe at the World Airline Awards 2013. This award represents the rating for an airline's performance across both airport staff and cabin staff combined. It is the second consecutive year that KLM won this award; in 2012 it was awarded with this title as well. On 19 June 2012, KLM made the first transatlantic flight fueled partly by sustainable biofuels to Rio de Janeiro. This was the longest distance any aircraft had flown on bio fuels.

In 2019, KLM celebrated its centennial, as it was founded in 1919. Since it is the oldest airline still operating under its original name, it was the first airline to achieve this feat.

2020s 
Being heavily affected by the COVID-19 pandemic, KLM cut at least 6,000 jobs total. It also said that the decisions of the government to have all the passengers and crew COVID-19 tested before flying will have an impact on its flights. On December 16, 2021, Air France-KLM announced an order for 100 Airbus A320neos to be divided between Transavia and KLM.  In July 2022, KLM was forced to cut their summer schedule due to disruption at airports across Europe.

Corporate affairs and identity

Business trends

Key business and operating results of KLM are shown below (as at year ending 31 December):

Management
, KLM's corporate leader is its president and chief executive officer (CEO) Pieter Elbers, who replaced Camiel Eurlings suddenly on 15 October 2014. The president and CEO is part of the larger Executive Committee, which manages KLM and consists of the statutory managing directors and executive vice-presidents of KLM's business units that are represented in the Executive Committee. The supervision and management of KLM are structured in accordance with the two-tier model; the Board of Managing Directors is supervised by a separate and independent Supervisory Board. The Supervisory Board also supervises the general performance of KLM. The Board of Managing Directors is formed by the four Managing Directors, including the CEO. Nine Supervisory Directors compose the Supervisory Board.

Head office

KLM's head office is located in Amstelveen, on a  site near Schiphol Airport. The airline's current headquarters was built between 1968 and 1970. Before the opening of the new headquarters, the airline's head office was on the property of Schiphol Airport in Haarlemmermeer.

Subsidiaries
Companies in which KLM has a stake include:

Former subsidiaries
Subsidiaries, associates, and joint ventures of KLM in the past include:

KLM also worked closely with ALM Antillean Airlines in the Caribbean in order to provide air service for the Dutch controlled islands in the region with KLM aircraft such as the Douglas DC-8 and McDonnell Douglas DC-9-30 being operated by KLM flight crews on behalf of ALM.

KLM Asia

KLM Asia is a wholly owned subsidiary registered in Taiwan. The airline was established in 1995 to operate flights to Taipei without compromising the traffic rights held by KLM for destinations in the People's Republic of China. Aircraft operated by the subsidiary receive several modifications to their livery: the Flag of the Netherlands and Europe are removed while KLM's stylised Dutch Crown logo is replaced with the KLM Asia wordmark.
 
The fleet of aircraft operated by the subsidiary consists of seven Boeing 777-200ER and two Boeing 777-300ER aircraft as of March 2020. KLM Asia initially operated the Amsterdam-Bangkok-Taipei route with Boeing 747-400 Combi and Boeing 747-400 aircraft. Since March 2012, it has operated the revised Amsterdam-Taipei-Manila route with Boeing 777-200ER/-300ER aircraft.

KLM Asia aircraft are also occasionally used to service other destinations in the wider KLM network. Despite this scenario, the only PRC destination that KLM Asia aircraft services is Hong Kong, a special administrative region outside of Mainland China.

Branding
Dirk Roosenburg designed the KLM logo at its establishment in 1919; he intertwined the letter K, L, and M, and gave them wings and a crown. The crown was depicted to denote KLM's royal status, which was granted at KLM's establishment. The logo became known as the "vinklogo" in reference to the common chaffinch. The KLM logo was largely redesigned in 1961 by F.H.K. Henrion. The crown, redesigned using a line, four blue circles and a cross, was retained. In 1991, the logo was further revised by Chris Ludlow of Henrion, Ludlow & Schmidt. In addition to its main logo, KLM displays its alliance status in its branding, including "Worldwide Reliability" with Northwest Airlines (1993–2002) and the SkyTeam alliance (2004–present).

Livery and uniforms

KLM has utilized several major liveries since its founding, with numerous variations on each. Initially, many aircraft featured a bare-metal fuselage with a stripe above the windows bearing the phrase "The Flying Dutchman". The rudder was divided into three segments and painted to match the Dutch flag. Later aircraft types sometimes bore a white upper fuselage, and additional detail striping and titling. In the mid-1950s, the livery was changed to feature a split cheatline in two shades of blue on a white upper fuselage and angled blue stripes on the vertical stabilizer. The tail stripes were later enlarged and made horizontal, and the then-new crown logo was placed in a white circle. The final major variation of this livery saw the vertical stabilizer painted completely white with the crown logo in the center. All versions of this livery had small "KLM Royal Dutch Airlines" titles, first in red, and later in blue.

Since 1971, the KLM livery has primarily featured a bright blue fuselage, with variations on the striping and details. Originally a wide, dark blue cheatline covered the windows and was separated from the light grey lower fuselage by a thin white stripe. The KLM logo was placed centrally on the white tail and the front of the fuselage. In December 2002, KLM introduced an updated livery in which the white strip was removed and the dark-blue cheatline was significantly narrowed. The bright blue colour was retained and now covers most of the fuselage. The KLM logo was placed more centrally on the fuselage while its position on the tail and the tail design remained the same. In 2014, KLM modified its livery with a swooping cheatline that wraps around the entire forward fuselage. The livery was first introduced on Embraer 190s.

In April 2010, KLM introduced new uniforms for its female cabin attendants, ground attendants and pilots at KLM and KLM Cityhopper. The new uniform was designed by Dutch couturier Mart Visser. It retains the KLM blue colour that was introduced in 1971 and adds a touch of orange—the national colour of the Netherlands.

Marketing slogans
KLM has used several slogans for marketing throughout its operational history:
 "The businessman travels, sends, and receives by KLM" (translated from Dutch) (1920s)
 "The Flying Dutchman"
 "Bridging the World" (1994)
 "The Reliable Airline"
 "Journeys of Inspiration" (2009–present)

Social media
KLM has an extensive presence on social media platforms and also runs a blog. Customers can make inquiries through these channels. The airline also uses these networks to inform customers of KLM news, marketing campaigns and promotions.

The airline's use of social media platforms to reach customers peaked when the Icelandic volcano Eyjafjallajökull erupted in April 2010, causing widespread disruption to air traffic. Customers used the social networks to contact the airline, which used them to provide information about the situation. Following the increased use of social media, KLM created a centralized, public social media website named the Social Media Hub in October 2010.

KLM has developed several services based on these social platforms, including:
 Meet & Seat; this service allows passengers to find information about people who will be on the same KLM flight by connecting their Facebook or LinkedIn profiles to the flight. Meet & Seat facilitates contact with fellow travelers who have the same background or interests. By launching Meet & Seat, KLM became the first airline to integrate social networking into its regular flight process.
 Trip Planner; this platform uses Facebook to organize a trip with Facebook friends.
 Twitterbots; KLM operates several Twitterbots, including one to request the current status of a flight and one to request the lowest KLM fares to a destination on a specified date or month.

In June 2013, KLM launched its own 3D strategy game "Aviation Empire" for iOS and Android platforms. The game allows users to experience airline management. Players manage KLM from its establishment until the present; they can invest in a fleet, build a network with international destinations and develop airports. The game combines the digital world with the real world by enabling the unlocking of airports by GPS check-ins.

Philanthropy
KLM started KLM AirCares, a program that aids underprivileged children in developing countries to which KLM flies, in 1999. The airline collects money and airmiles from passengers. In 2012, new applications for support from the program were suspended because it needed an overhaul.

Destinations

KLM and its partners serve 133 destinations in 70 countries on five continents from their hub at Amsterdam Airport Schiphol. Codeshare agreements bring the total amount of destinations available via KLM to 826.

Codeshare agreements
KLM has codeshare agreements with the following airlines:

 
 Aerolíneas Argentinas
 Aeroméxico
 Air Astana
 Air Baltic
 Air Europa
 Air France
 Air Malta
 Air Serbia
 Belavia
 Bulgaria Air
 China Airlines
 China Eastern Airlines
 China Southern Airlines
 Copa Airlines
 Croatia Airlines
 Czech Airlines
 Delta Air Lines
 Etihad Airways
 Garuda Indonesia
 Georgian Airways
 Gol Transportes Aéreos
 IndiGo
 ITA Airways
 Kenya Airways
 KLM Cityhopper
 Korean Air
 Malaysia Airlines
 Middle East Airlines
 Pegasus Airlines
 Saudia
 Sichuan Airlines
 TAROM
 Transavia
 Vietnam Airlines
 Virgin Atlantic
 WestJet
 Widerøe
 Winair
 XiamenAir

Fleet

Fleet strategy

KLM's first of 8 Boeing 787-10 aircraft was delivered on 28 June 2019; it featured 100th anniversary markings.

On 19 June 2013, KLM ordered 7 Airbus A350-900s. In June 2019, Air France–KLM announced that KLM will not take up any of the group's ordered A350s, because of fleet rationalization purposes.

CEO Ben Smith has announced at Air France's Investor Day (5 November 2019) in Paris that "in the near future" KLM will only use the 777 and 787 as their long-haul fleet, retiring their 13 A330's.

In December 2021, Air France-KLM ordered 100 Airbus A320neo family aircraft to replace KLM and Transavia’s Boeing 737 Next Generation and Air France’s Airbus A320’s.

Special liveries

KLM has several aircraft painted in special liveries; they include:
 PH-BVA, a Boeing 777-300ER, features an orange forward fuselage that fades into the standard blue to commemorate the Netherlands national team's participation in the 2016 Summer Olympics in Rio de Janeiro.
 PH-KZU, a Fokker F70, had been applied with a special livery featuring Anthony Fokker prior to its phase-out, the founder of Fokker, commemorating the airline's long-standing history with Fokker aircraft and the phase-out of the Fokker 70 aircraft in October 2017.
 Several aircraft bear the silver SkyTeam alliance livery, including PH-BVD (a 777-300ER), PH-BXO (a 737-900), and PH-EZX (a KLM Cityhopper ERJ-190).
PH-BKA, a Boeing 787-10, features the standard KLM livery with a 100 wrapped around its lettering on the plane, this is because of the 100 years of being an established airline.

Cabin

KLM has three cabin classes for international long-haul routes; World Business Class, Economy Comfort and Economy. Personal screens with audio-video on-demand, satellite telephone, SMS, and e-mail services are available in all cabins on all long-haul aircraft. European short-haul and medium-haul flights have Economy seats in the rear cabin, and Economy Comfort and Europe Business in the forward cabin.

World Business Class

World Business Class is KLM's long-haul business class product. Seats are equipped with a  personal entertainment system with audio and video on demand in the armrest, privacy canopy, massage function and laptop power ports. World Business Class seating is in a 2–2–2 abreast arrangement on all Airbus A330s.

In March 2013, KLM introduced a new World Business Class seat to the long-haul fleet. Dutch designer Hella Jongerius designed the new cabin. The diamond-type seat is manufactured by B/E Aerospace and is currently installed on all Airbus A330s and Boeing 777s. The seats were also refurbished on former KLM Boeing 747-400s between 2013 and 2014. The new seats are fully flat and offer -high definition personal entertainment systems. The cabin features a cradle-to-cradle carpet made from old uniforms woven in an intricate pattern, which is combined with new pillows and curtains with a similar design.

A completely new design of Business Class seat was introduced with the launch of KLM's Boeing 787; this aircraft's business class seats are based on the Zodiac Cirrus platform used by Air France. The new seats lie fully flat, with a 1-2-1 layout so every passenger has direct aisle access, a large side-storage area and  HD video screen.

The tableware and cutlery for business class in-flight service was designed by Marcel Wanders. Dutch fashion stylists Viktor & Rolf designed amenity kits for World Business Class passengers. A new design will be introduced each year and the color of the kits will change every six months. The kit contains socks, eye mask, toothbrush, toothpaste, earplugs and Viktor & Rolf lip balm.

In 2022, KLM announced they would retrofit Boeing 777 aircraft in their fleet (notably, the 777-300 and 777-200) with seats in a 1-2-1 reverse herringbone configuration while installing Premium Comfort seats. These new seats will feature a "door" for extra privacy.

Europe Business Class
Europe Business Class is KLM's and KLM Cityhopper's short-haul business-class. Middle seats in rows of three are blocked to increase passengers' personal space. Europe Business Class seats feature extra legroom and recline further than regular Economy Class seats. In-seat power is available on all Boeing 737 aircraft's. Europe Business Class has no personal entertainment. Seating is arranged 3–3 abreast with the middle seat blocked on the Boeing 737 aircraft, and a 2–2 abreast arrangement on the Embraer E-Jet family and Embraer E-Jet E2 aircraft.

Premium Comfort 
In 2022, KLM announced they would retrofit their long haul fleet to include Premium Comfort. Premium Comfort will be a new cabin in front of Economy Comfort, with between 21 and 28 new seats featuring a 13" touch screen, a movable leg- and footrest, 7.8 inches recline (20 cm) and up to 6.7 inches (17 cm) more pitch than Economy seats. Passengers in Premium Comfort can also enjoy improved food and beverage service, as well as SkyPriority benefits.

Economy Comfort
Economy Comfort is the premium economy class offered on all KLM and KLM Cityhopper flights. Except for the increased pitch and recline, seating and service in Economy Comfort is the same as in Economy Class. Economy Comfort is located in a separate cabin before the Economy Class; passengers can exit the aircraft before Economy passengers.

Economy Comfort seats can be reserved by Economy Class passengers. The service is free for passengers with a full-fare ticket, for Flying Blue Platinum members and Delta Air Lines SkyMiles Platinum or Diamond members. Discounts apply for Flying Blue Silver or Gold members, SkyTeam Elite Plus members and Delta SkyMiles members.

Economy Class
All seats are equipped with adjustable winged headrests, a  PTV with AVOD, and a personal handset satellite telephone that can be used with a credit card. Economy Class seats in Airbus A330-300 aircraft are also equipped with in-seat power. The Economy Class seats on short-haul flights do not feature any personal entertainment. The long-haul Economy Class seating is in a 3–4–3 abreast arrangement on the Boeing 747-400, Boeing 777-300ER aircraft and on Boeing 777-200ER aircraft, a 3-3-3 abreast arrangement on the Boeing 787-9 aircraft, and a 2–4–2 abreast arrangement on the Airbus A330 aircraft.

Services

In-flight entertainment
KLM's in-flight entertainment system is available in all classes on all widebody aircraft's; it provides all passengers with Audio/Video on Demand (AVOD). The system includes interactive entertainment including movies, television programs, music, games, and language courses. About 80 movies including recent releases, classics and world cinema are available in several languages. The selection is changed every month. The in-flight entertainment system can be used to send SMS text messages and emails to the ground. Panasonic's 3000i system is installed on all Boeing 747-400, Boeing 777-200ER, and on most of the Airbus A330-200 aircraft. All Airbus A330-300 and Boeing 777-300ER aircraft, and some Airbus A330-200 aircraft are fitted with the Panasonic eX2 in-flight entertainment system.

KLM provides a selection of international newspapers to its passengers on long-haul flights; on short-haul flights they are offered only to Europe Business Class passengers. A selection of international magazines is available for World Business Class passengers on long-haul flights. All passengers are provided with KLM's in-flight magazine, the Holland Herald. On board flights to China, South Korea and Japan, the airline offers in-flight magazines EuroSky (China and Japan), in either Chinese or Japanese, and Wings of Europe (South Korea) in Korean. On 29 May 2013, KLM and Air France launched a pilot scheme to test in-flight WiFi internet access. Each airline equipped one Boeing 777-300ER in its fleet with WiFi, which passengers can use with their WiFi-enabled devices. Wireless service was available after the aircraft reached  in altitude.

Catering
World Business Class passengers are served a three-course meal. Each year KLM partners with a leading Dutch chef to develop the dishes that are served on board. Passengers in Europe Business Class are served either a cold meal, a hot main course, or a three-course meal depending on the duration of the flight. All chicken served in World and Europe Business Class meets the standards of the Dutch Beter Leven Keurmerk (Better Life Quality Mark). KLM partnered with Dutch designer Marcel Wanders to design the tableware of World and European Business Class.

Economy Class passengers on long-haul flights are served a hot meal and a snack, and second hot meal or breakfast, depending on the duration of the flight. On short-haul flights, passengers are served sandwiches or a choice of sweet or savoury snack, depending on the duration and time of the day. If the flight is at least two hours long, "stroopwafel" cookies are served before the descent. Most alcoholic beverages are free-of-charge for all passengers. After a successful trial period, KLM introduced à la carte meals in Economy Class on 14 September 2011; Dutch, Japanese, Italian, cold delicacies, and Indonesian meals are offered.

Special meals, include children's, vegetarian, medical, and religious meals, can be requested in each class up to 24 or 36 hours before departure. On flights to India, China, South Korea, and Japan, KLM offers authentic Asian meals in all classes. Meals served on KLM flights departing from Amsterdam are provided by KLM Catering Services.

In September 2016, KLM launched the world's first in-flight draft beer under the partnership with Heineken. The new service made its premiere aboard a flight to Curaçao in the airline's World Business Class cabin.

Delft Blue houses

Since the 1950s, KLM has presented its World Business Class passengers with a Delft blue miniature traditional Dutch house. These miniatures are reproductions of real Dutch houses and are filled with Dutch genever. Initially the houses were filled with Bols liqueur, which in 1986 was changed to Bols young genever.

In 1952, KLM started to give the houses to its First Class passengers. With the elimination of First Class in 1993, the houses were handed out to all Business Class passengers. The impetus for these houses was a rule aimed at curtailing a previously widespread practise of offering incentives to passengers by limiting the value of gifts given by airlines to US$0.75. KLM did not bill the Delft Blue houses as a gift, but as a last drink on the house, which was served in the house.

Every year, a new house is presented on 7 October, the anniversary of KLM's founding in 1919. The number on the last-presented house thus represents the number of years KLM has been in operation. Special edition houses—the Dutch Royal Palace and the 17th century Cheese Weighing House De Waag in Gouda—are offered to special guests, such as VIPs and honeymoon couples.

Ground services
KLM offers various check-in methods to its passengers, who can check in for their flights at self-service check-in kiosks at the airport, via the Internet, or a mobile telephone or tablet. At destinations where these facilities are not available, check-in is by an airline representative at the counter. Electronic boarding passes can be received on a mobile device while boarding passes can be printed at airport kiosks.

Since 4 July 2008 KLM, in cooperation with Amsterdam Airport Schiphol, has been offering self-service baggage drop-off to its passengers. The project started with a trial that included one drop-off point. The number of these points has gradually increased;  there are 12 of them. KLM passengers can now drop off their bags themselves. Before they are allowed to do that they are being checked by a KLM employee.

In November 2012, KLM started a pilot scheme at Amsterdam Airport Schiphol to test self-service boarding. Passengers boarded the aircraft without any interference of a gate agent by scanning their boarding passes, which opened a gate. KLM partner airline Air France ran the same pilot at its hub at Paris-Charles de Gaulle Airport. The pilot ran until March 2013, which was followed by an evaluation.

KLM is the first airline to offer self-service transfer kiosks on its European and intercontinental routes for passengers connecting through Amsterdam Airport Schiphol. The kiosks enable connecting passengers to view flight details of connecting flights, to change seat assignments or upgrade to a more comfortable seat. When a passenger misses a connecting flight, details about alternative flights can be viewed on the kiosk and a new boarding pass can be printed. Passengers who are entitled to coupons for a beverage, meal, the use of a telephone, or a travel discount can have these printed at the kiosk.

Bus services and train codeshares
KLM has bus services for customers living in certain cities without flights from KLM, transporting them to airports where they may board KLM flights. It operates buses from Nijmegen railway station and Arnhem Central Station in the Netherlands to Amsterdam Schiphol, from Maastricht railway station (IATA-code ZYT) via Maastricht-Aachen Airport (IATA-code MST) and Eindhoven Airport (IATA-code EIN) to Amsterdam Schiphol (IATA-code AMS), and from Ottawa Railway Station to Montreal Dorval Airport in Canada. In addition KLM has codeshares with Thalys and SNCF services so passengers from various French cities may travel to Charles de Gaulle Airport and passengers from Belgium may go to Schiphol (from Antwerp) or Charles de Gaulle (from Brussels).

Flying Blue

Air France-KLM's frequent flyer program, Flying Blue, awards miles based on the distance traveled, ticket fare and class of service. Other airlines that adopted the Flying Blue programme include Air Europa, Kenya Airways, Aircalin, and TAROM. Miles can also be earned from all other SkyTeam partners. Membership in the program is free. When flying, members earn Experience Points (XP) and Award Miles. Award Miles can be exchanged for rewards and expire after 24 months without flying. Experience Points are used to determine membership level and remain valid until the end of the qualification period, which lasts for 1 year from counting from your first flight.

Award Miles can be earned on Flying Blue partner airlines including Air Corsica, Airlinair, Bangkok Airways, Chalair Aviation, Copa Airlines, Gol Transportes Aéreos, Japan Airlines, Malaysia Airlines, Qantas, TAAG Angola, Twin Jet, and Ukraine International Airlines, as well as SkyTeam partners. Award Miles are redeemable for free tickets, upgrades to a more expensive seating class, extra baggage allowance, wifi on board and lounge access. They can also be donated to charity through KLM AirCares, or can be spent in the Flying Blue Store.

The Flying Blue programme is divided into four tiers; Explorer, Silver (SkyTeam Elite), Gold (SkyTeam Elite Plus) and Platinum (SkyTeam Elite Plus). There are special tiers, such as Platinum For Life, Platinum Ultimate, ultimate platinum skipper, club2000 skipper (for those who did something special for KLM, cannot be requested but will be distributed by KLM). The membership tier depends on the number of Experience Points earned and is recalculated each qualification period. Flying Blue privileges are additive by membership tier; higher tiers include all benefits listed for prior tiers. There is an additional fifth tier, Platinum for Life, which can be obtained after 10 consecutive years of Platinum membership. After the Platinum for Life status is obtained, re-qualification is not required. XP can be earned with Air France, KLM, Air Europa, Kenya Airways, TAROM, and other SkyTeam partners. Qualification levels and general benefits with SkyTeam airline partners of the Flying Blue tiers are:

In June 2022, Brim Financial from Canada announce they will launch an Air France-KLM co-branded credit card. Target to expand their customer base into the Canadian market.

Accidents and incidents

Tenerife airport disaster

The Tenerife disaster, which occurred on 27 March 1977, remains the accident with the highest number of airliner passenger fatalities, as well as the most recent fatal and notable incident involving a KLM aircraft. 583 people died when a KLM Boeing 747-200B attempted to take off without clearance, and collided with a taxiing Pan Am Boeing 747-100 at Los Rodeos Airport on the Canary Island of Tenerife, Spain. No one on the KLM 747 survived (14 crew, 234 passengers were killed) while 61 of the 396 passengers and crew on the Pan Am aircraft survived. Pilot error from the KLM aircraft was the primary cause. Owing to a communication misunderstanding, the KLM captain thought he had clearance for takeoff. Another cause was dense fog, meaning the KLM flight crew was unable to see the Pan Am aircraft on the runway until immediately prior to the collision. The accident had a lasting influence on the industry, particularly in the area of communication. An increased emphasis was placed on using standardized phraseology in air traffic control (ATC) communication by both controllers and pilots alike, thereby reducing the chance for misunderstandings. As part of these changes, the word "takeoff" was removed from general usage, and is only spoken by ATC when clearing an aircraft to take off.

Other accidents and incidents

Notable employees
 Jacob Veldhuyzen van Zanten, pilot
 Ingrid de Caluwé
 Bob Hiensch, flight attendant
 Joop van Werkhoven
 Leo Visser, pilot
 Lisa Westerhof, pilot
 King Willem-Alexander, guest pilot

See also

 Air transport in the Netherlands
 List of airports in the Netherlands
 List of companies of the Netherlands

Citations

General bibliography

External links

 
 Air France-KLM
 A century KLM
 

Air France–KLM
Airlines established in 1919
Airlines of the Netherlands
Association of European Airlines members
Amstelveen
Companies based in North Holland
Dutch brands
Dutch companies established in 1919
Former seaplane operators
Multinational companies headquartered in the Netherlands
Organisations based in the Netherlands with royal patronage
SkyTeam
Government-owned companies of the Netherlands